Meirim River is a river of Alagoas state in eastern Brazil.

See also
List of rivers of Alagoas

External links
Alagoas road map

Rivers of Alagoas